Dolocucullia is a genus of American moth in the family of Noctuidae.

Species
Dolocucullia dentilinea (Smith, 1899)
Dolocucullia minor (Barnes & McDunnough, 1913)

References
Natural History Museum Lepidoptera genus database

Cuculliinae